The United Rugby Championship (URC) is an annual rugby union competition involving professional teams from Ireland, Italy, Scotland, South Africa, and Wales. The current name was adopted in 2021 when the league expanded to include four South African teams previously from the SANZAR Super Rugby competition. The league is one of the three major professional leagues in Europe (along with the English Premiership and the French Top 14), the most successful teams from which go forward to compete in the European Rugby Champions Cup. Since 2022–23, despite the name, South African teams have been eligible to qualify for European competition, and one South African place is guaranteed.

Beginning with the creation of the Welsh–Scottish League in 1999, the league became known as the Celtic League when it grew to include teams from Ireland, Scotland and Wales. The league was sponsored by Irish cider makers Magners from the 2006–07 season until 2010–11. At the start of the 2010–11 season, the league expanded from 10 to 12 teams, adding two Italian teams. Following the end of Magners' sponsorship, the league was sponsored by RaboDirect from 2011–12 through to 2013–14. The Pro12 name was adopted in 2011 to reflect that the league now included teams from outside the Celtic nations. A further expansion to 14 teams (and the subsequent renaming to Pro14) took place from the 2017–18 season, with two South African teams joining the Championship until the 2019–20 season. The recent sponsorship deal with Guinness began at the beginning of the 2014–15 season, and concluded after the Pro14 Rainbow Cup in July 2021. Following the rebranding to the United Rugby Championship or the URC for short, the league formed a new partnership with Roc Nation.

Tournament format

Current format
The championship season as of 2021–22 takes place between September and May, with teams split into four regional pools: The Irish Shield pool, the Welsh Shield pool, the South African Shield pool and the Scottish and Italian Shield pool. Teams will also be sorted into a single league table.

Teams will play each of the other teams in their pool twice (home and away) and each team from the other pools once (either home or away). This ensures that Irish, South African and Welsh teams each play six derby matches. For Italy and Scotland, their respective clubs will play their own nations' sides only twice.

This creates an 18-match regular season before the play-offs. The play-offs are made up of the top eight teams, and consist of a straight knockout tournament. Teams are seeded 1–8 and the lowest-seeded teams receive home advantage. The final will be held in a pre-arranged venue.

Championship points are awarded using the bonus points system; 4 points for a win and 2 for a draw. Bonus points can be earned so long as teams can either score four or more tries in a game and or lose by seven points or less – should a team do both, two bonus points are gained.

As for European qualification, the South African teams are eligible for European competition. Eight places are allocated for teams competing in the competition, despite the change of format. The Shield winner in each pool will gain qualification into the Champions Cup. The remaining four places are allocated to the next four highest-placed teams in the main table.

With three fewer regular season fixtures than in the Pro14, but with an extra round of playoffs, the season is truncated slightly to 21 match weeks and thus can still be scheduled to same time period as previous models of the competition. Clashes between league matches and international weekends in November and during the Six Nations Championship have been reduced.

Due to the travelling distance between Europe and South Africa, home South African games will always be played on a Saturday, allowing visiting teams to have a seven-day turnaround between fixtures and includes five "clean days" that do not involve any travel. Should the draw see European teams play both South African teams away, the schedule will see the away team play the two matches back-to-back across two weeks, acting as a "mini-tour".

On 24 September 2021, URC confirmed that the top side in each regional pool after the end of the 18-game regular season would be awarded a trophy, a regional Shield. In Ireland, Wales and South Africa, this shield (the Irish Shield, Welsh Shield and South African Shield respectively) functions as an informal national championship title for the main professional sides, while in Scotland and Italy's shared pool, it will be a joint regional trophy. The concept is comparable to the Divisional Championships in the NFL which are also loosely geographically based. Winning a Shield will also guarantee qualification for the European Rugby Champions Cup, regardless of overall league position.

Format history
The league has used a play-off structure since the 2009–10 season to determine the champions, similar to that used in the English Premiership. For the first two seasons there were two groups and a knockout to determine a winner. Starting from the 2003–04 season until the 2008–09 season, the champions were determined from league performance, with all the teams in one league. From the 2017–18 season, the regular season employed a conference structure rather than a single round robin league, with 'derby games' between teams from the same nation being protected, and an expanded playoff structure. This allowed the competition to control the calendar, and control the number of games per team.

League points are awarded using the bonus points system. Until and including the 2008–09 season, the champions were decided solely on the basis of who finished top of the league table, but since the 2009–10 season, the league champion has been decided by a play-off series, in line with other rugby club competitions such as Super Rugby, Top 14, and the English Premiership: at the conclusion of the regular season, the top four placed teams enter the semi-final stage, with the winner of the first vs fourth and second vs third play-offs entering the final (known as the "grand final" in 2010 and 2011).

Two Italian teams – the former National Championship of Excellence team Benetton Treviso, and a new team, Aironi – joined the league starting with the 2010–11 season. Aironi was replaced by Zebre from the 2012–13 season. Through the 2012–13 season, the Welsh, Irish, Scottish and Italian rugby unions used the league as the sole determinant for Heineken Cup qualification, and from 2013–14 they use it as the sole means of qualification for the successor to the Heineken Cup, the European Rugby Champions Cup.

Corporate organisation
The legal name of the body running the competition is PRO Rugby Championship DAC, a private company limited by shares based in Ireland. The organisation is responsible for running and operating the URC and is currently owned equally by the Irish Rugby Football Union (IRFU), the Scottish Rugby Union (SRU) and the Welsh Rugby Union (WRU). The Italian Rugby Federation (FIR) may become a shareholder subject to it meeting certain conditions.

The board of Celtic Rugby DAC is made up of representatives from the IRFU, SRU, WRU, ProRugby Wales, the FIR and the South African Rugby Union. The chief executive is Martin Anayi.

In 2020 the championship received an investment from CVC Capital Partners who acquired a 28% share in the championship.

The organisation's headquarters are at Millbank House, Sandyford, Dublin 18.

Media coverage
Starting in the 2010–11 season, the League was broadcast live on BBC Two Wales, BBC Two Northern Ireland, RTÉ, the Irish language channel TG4, the Scottish Gaelic channel BBC Alba, the Welsh channel S4C. The BBC Two Wales matches were usually made available to the rest of the United Kingdom via BBC Red Button. Complete match replays were also available on the BBC iPlayer. Each broadcaster provided feeds to the others for matches in their home territory. While this meant that the league was now available free to air in the UK and Ireland, in Italy it was only available on a subscription basis in its first year.

Commencing from the 2014–15 season, Sky Sports became one of the league's broadcast partners, broadcasting 33 live games on a Saturday and also showing both the semi-finals and the final live. Its contract concluded at the end of 2017–18 season.

Also starting in the 2014–15 season, Italy's Nuvolari began broadcasting the games involving the two Italian clubs live on its digital free-to-view channel. Glasgow Warriors and Edinburgh matches were also broadcast live on BBC Radio Scotland.

From the 2018–19 season, coverage of the tournament was taken over by Premier Sports in the UK, EirSport in Ireland, DAZN in Italy, and Supersport in South Africa.

Coverage of the tournament can be found in other territories – on beIN Sports in France, and on various Setanta Sports channels around the globe (including Australia, New Zealand, Canada, South East Asia and the Middle East), as well as EuroSport.

Broadcast coverage history

Current broadcasters:
 URC TV (Ireland and other countries without broadcaster) (2021–present)
 TG4 (Ireland – Irish language) (2001–2004, 2010–present)
 RTÉ Sport (Ireland) (2010–2014, 2021–present)
 S4C (Wales – Welsh language) (2001–present)
 BBC Wales (2001–2018, 2021–present)
 BBC Northern Ireland (2001–2004, 2010–2018, 2021–present)
 Eurosport (non-Core markets) (2016–present)
 DAZN (Germany & Canada) (2018–present)
 SuperSport (South Africa) (2017–present)
 Viaplay Sports (UK and Ireland) (UK: 2018–present)  (Ireland: 2021–present)
Setanta Sports (Asia) (2011–present)
 Eurosport Italia: (2016–2018; 2022–present)

Past broadcasters:
 Sky Sports (2014–2018) 
 eir sport (Ireland) (2018–2021)
 Setanta Sports (Live 2004–2010, Highlights 2010–2018)
 The Rugby Channel (2016–2018)
 beIN Sports (2014–2018)
 BBC Alba (2010–2018)
 BBC Scotland (UK) 
 STV (Live 2009–2010, Highlights 2010–2013)
 SKY Italia (2003)
 Dahlia TV (2010–2011)
 Sportitalia (2012–2013)
 Nuvolari (2014–2015)
 RAI Sport (2011–2012, 2015–2016)
 DAZN (Italy) (2018–2021)
 Mediaset (Italy) (2013–2014, 2021−2022)
 ESPN (USA) (2018–present)

From 2004 to 2009, the Scottish and Irish rights were owned by Setanta Sports. Setanta closed down in Scotland in 2009, but Setanta Ireland and Setanta Sports 1 remained available to Irish subscribers. In 2010, RTÉ Sport, BBC Northern Ireland, TG4, BBC Wales, BBC Alba and SKY Italia came together to buy the Celtic League broadcasting rights.

On 2 May 2013, Sky Sports announced that it had agreed a four-year deal to broadcast 33 live matches each season. This deal commenced at the start of season 2014–15, Sky have 30 exclusive matches but are only allowed to cover one set of fixtures; for instance, only one Leinster v Munster match was live on Sky with the other on TG4. Regional screening of matches continued, BBC Wales show Scrum V Live on Friday Night with S4C covering a match now on Sunday afternoons. BBC Alba also screened matches, with some also available in English on BBC Scotland, although BBC Alba did offer English language commentary via their Red Button service when the match was not shown on BBC Scotland. BBC Northern Ireland screened all Ulster matches not available on Sky Sports. RTÉ Sport dropped their coverage after the 2014 final due to budget cuts, making TG4 the only broadcasters of the competition in the Republic of Ireland. The semi-finals and finals are available to all broadcasters.

On 31 August 2017, SuperSport announced that it had acquired the rights to broadcast matches within South Africa.

On 30 April 2018, PRO14 Rugby signed a partnership with Premier Sports and FreeSports to broadcast every Pro14 game live in high definition across the UK for at least the next three years. The agreement, which came into effect for the 2018–19 season, also saw at least one match per round shown live free-to-air on FreeSports.

Teams
The league is based on regionalised, provincial and franchise representation of the participating nations, except for Benetton which represents the city of Treviso itself. Benetton was selected for its long history after the project of a second Italian regional team, Praetorians Roma, failed.

Benetton Rugby won the Pro14 Rainbow Cup, a transitional 'spring league' conference-based tournament that took place between the Pro14 and URC incarnations of the competition. The victory is recognised as an official title for the Italians, the first ever won by a team from that country, but is not recognised as part of the annual continuity of the main tournament.

Italian participation since 2010–11
The Celtic League board met in November 2008 to explore the possibility of Italian participation; the chief executive of the Welsh Rugby Union, Roger Lewis, stated that the league was looking "favourably" on Italian participation.
Following a 19 December 2008 board meeting of the Italian Rugby Federation (FIR) to discuss proposals to improve Italian rugby, FIR announced that it would submit a proposal to join the Celtic League.

FIR had two possibilities – either entering four existing Italian clubs from the National Championship of Excellence into the league; or creating two teams of Italy-qualified players exclusively for the competition.
On 18 July 2009, the FIR announced that Aironi and Praetorians Roma would compete in the Celtic League from the start of the 2010–11 season – beating bids from Benetton Treviso and Duchi Nord-Ovest. Praetorians would be based in Rome at the Stadio Flaminio, while Aironi would be based in Viadana but would play some matches in the city of Reggio Emilia.
On 2 October 2009, the FIR proposed Benetton Treviso in place of Praetorians Roma.

On 28 January 2010, the FIR declared that they had withdrawn from negotiations with the Celtic League regarding two Italian teams joining the tournament, with the main issue being a €3 million warranty asked for by the league, but by 7 February, the Italian clubs had come up with the required funding. By 8 March 2010, a deal had been finalised for Aironi and Benetton Treviso to enter the Celtic League from the 2010–11 season, with each team guaranteed a place in the Heineken Cup.

At the end of the 2011–12 season, however, Aironi were no longer available to compete in future competitions as a regional club, as, on 6 April 2012, they were refused a licence to continue on financial grounds. They were replaced by another Italian side, Zebre (now Zebre Parma).

Former teams

Notes:

 Before regionalisation, Wales was represented by nine Welsh Premiership clubs from 2001 to 2003.
 Aironi was replaced by Zebre, meaning that the number of Italian teams remained at two.
 The Border Reivers were disbanded by the Scottish Rugby Union as part of cost-cutting measures.

Other nations
After the successful negotiations with Italy, talks were held intermittently with South Africa about the possible expansion of the Pro12. A 24-team Rainbow Cup involving 11 Celtic, 9 South African and 4 Italian teams was announced in 2005, but the idea was abandoned because of financial issues on the European end of the deal and changes in the leadership of the South African Rugby Union (SARU).

London Welsh expressed interest in 2006 in joining the Celtic League if promotion and relegation were to be removed from the English Premiership.

In February 2009, South Africa was rumoured to be negotiating entry of its current Super Rugby teams into the Celtic League, to take effect when the media contract between SANZAR and News Corporation expires after the 2010 season; these rumours were immediately denied by SA Rugby, the commercial arm of SARU. In the end, nothing came of these rumours, and the competition remained a strictly European affair.

In a 2016 interview with The Irish Times, IRFU CEO Philip Browne indicated that the Pro12 was seriously considering establishing a US franchise on the country's Atlantic coast in the near future, seeing the recent growth of the sport in the US as an opportunity to help close some of the financial gap between Pro12 and Europe's two major domestic leagues, the English Premiership and France's Top 14. Browne added that Pro12 was also looking to expand further into Continental Europe by teaming with major association football clubs, some of which already have rugby sections.

In August 2016, Pro12 officials began talks with the unions of both Canada and the United States about expansion before the end of the decade, with interest in putting teams on the east coasts of both countries. In September 2016, it emerged that Vancouver and Houston may be target cities, primarily due to weather considerations, though the distance from the other teams may make that more of a challenge.

While the North American plan remains active, media attention turned in 2017 toward a new possibility of South African teams entering the competition. Following the decision of Super Rugby organiser SANZAAR to drop three teams from the competition (two from South Africa), multiple media reports indicated that the two likeliest South African sides to be axed, the Cheetahs and Southern Kings, could be added to Pro12 as early as the 2017–18 season. A later BBC report indicated that the Cheetahs and Kings would be added once their removal from Super Rugby was formally announced on 7 July, though neither Celtic Rugby Limited, the South African Rugby Union, nor the two teams would comment on the report. A week after the Cheetahs and Kings' departure from Super Rugby was confirmed, the BBC reported that Celtic Rugby Limited was expected to officially add those teams at the organisation's next board meeting on 18 July. While no announcement came on that date, media in both South Africa and Britain reported that SARU's chief executive was at Celtic Rugby's headquarters in Dublin to finalise the addition of the Cheetahs and Kings, with Reuters calling the expansion "the worst kept secret in rugby". The addition of the two South African teams was officially confirmed on 1 August 2017. The Southern Kings entered liquidation in September 2020 and therefore withdrew from the league.

In September 2020 the league confirmed they were looking for a replacement team for Southern Kings and possible expansion to more teams in South Africa to enter the league in 2021. Later that month, SA rugby voted that their Super Rugby sides (Lions, Stormers, Sharks, Bulls) would enter the Pro 14 to replace the liquidated Kings and the Cheetahs, who were withdrawn before the 2021 season.

Current standings

The most recent regular season began on 16 September 2022.

History

Formative years and the Welsh-Scottish League

Pan-Celtic tournaments were proposed throughout the early professional era, with the creation of the Heineken Cup in 1995 demonstrating that inter-domestic competitions were financially viable. From 1995 onwards, the Welsh Rugby Union (WRU), Scottish Rugby Union (SRU) and Irish Rugby Football Union (IRFU) discussed a number of Celtic league and cup competitions, discussions were also held with the Rugby Football Union (RFU) to form a British & Irish league. These discussions would eventually lead the WRU and the RFU to establish the Anglo-Welsh Cup in 2005, and all four unions to establish the British and Irish Cup in 2009.

The first material steps toward a Celtic league were taken before the 1999–2000 season, when the Scottish districts Edinburgh and Glasgow were formally invited to join the fully professional Welsh Premier Division, creating the Welsh–Scottish League. By 2001, an agreement was made with the Irish Rugby Football Union (IRFU) to bring in the four Irish provinces. The 2001–02 season saw additional matches and a new league structure played alongside the continuing Welsh–Scottish League and the Inter-Provincial Championship in Ireland. The new format was named the Celtic League. The Celtic League had developed by 2005, and the tournament became the sole professional league in Ireland and Scotland (the Anglo-Welsh Cup and semi-pro Welsh Premiership continued in Wales) and had entirely replaced both the Welsh–Scottish League, and the Inter-Provincial Championship.

Celtic League (2001–2011)

2001–02

The first full season of a pan-Celtic competition saw 15 teams compete: the four Irish provinces (Connacht, Leinster, Munster and Ulster), two Scottish teams (Edinburgh Reivers and Glasgow) and all nine Welsh professional teams (Bridgend, Caerphilly, Cardiff RFC, Ebbw Vale, Llanelli, Neath, Newport, Pontypridd and Swansea).

Played alongside each country's own domestic competitions, the teams were split into two groups (of eight and seven) and played a series of round-robin matches with each team playing the other only once. The top four teams from each group proceeded into the knock-out phase until a champion was found. Clashes between teams in the Welsh–Scottish League also counted towards the new competition.

The 2001–02 competition was dominated by the Irish teams with all four sides reaching the last eight, three progressing to the semi-finals, and the thrilling final played at Lansdowne Road contested between Leinster and Munster with Leinster running out 24–20 winners.

2002–03

Champions Leinster failed to make the quarter-final stage in 2003. In their absence, Munster went on to win the competition by beating Connacht 33–3 in the quarter-finals, Ulster 42–10 in the semi-finals, and Neath 37–17 in the final played in Cardiff.

The format of the Celtic League remained the same for the second season, but saw the addition of a third Scottish district, the newly re-established Scottish Borders. However, the Welsh-Scottish league structure ended permanently in 2002, allowing for the expansion of the Celtic league format in the following season.

2003–04

A major change in Celtic League came before the start of the 2003–04 season. The Welsh Rugby Union voted to create five new regional sides (Cardiff Blues, Celtic Warriors, Llanelli Scarlets, Neath–Swansea Ospreys and Newport Gwent Dragons). It was agreed that the Celtic League would become the sole professional league of the three countries, incorporating the four Irish, three Scottish and five new Welsh professional teams.

Reformatted into a traditional league competition (double round-robin style, all clubs play each other twice, once home, once away), which meant that a season long 22-round match program was launched, and with a new strength in depth due to the amalgamation of Welsh teams and the continuing strengthening of Irish and Scottish teams through the re-signing and retention of star players, the league has been in rugby terms a success. Also introduced for the 2003–04 season was the Celtic Cup, a straight knock-out cup competition between the 12 Celtic League teams.

However the unfortunate timing of the league's launch and poor organisation of a working calendar meant that first the 2003 Rugby World Cup and later the Six Nations Championship prevented many of the league's top stars from playing in over half the games. This caused the league to struggle commercially, especially regarding the newly adopted regions in Wales where the game has always traditionally been played on a club basis, not having the regional histories of Ireland or Scotland. The season ended with the Llanelli Scarlets running out as eventual winners, four points ahead of Ulster.

2004–05

The Welsh Rugby Union controversially purchased and liquidated the Celtic Warriors so that the 2004–05 season saw eleven teams compete in the Celtic League. The new format took the league into what many saw as a make-or-break season, clear of massive distractions such as the Rugby World Cup. With the Welsh regions partly embedded, the signs were that the Celtic League would be a competition that could continue. It was suggested that Italian sides might join an expanded Celtic League, an idea that eventually happened in 2010.

The league format was further refined at the end of the 2003–04 season, with the participants better managing the dates of the matches so as to not interfere with the national squad set-ups and to make the league more commercially viable. The league was played until April, and then the Celtic Cup was contested among the top eight teams.

The 2004–05 season was the first season that Ireland agreed to use the Celtic League standings to determine which provinces would enter the Heineken Cup. The IRFU had previously classed Connacht as a "development" team and so nominated Leinster, Munster and Ulster over Connacht.
The IRFU also insisted on International squad training sessions taking precedence over Celtic League matches, with Irish provinces (especially Munster and Leinster) occasionally fielding virtual second teams for Celtic League games. Some claimed this had the effect of devaluing the competition. However, despite this approach, Munster finished second and Leinster third, with Munster winning the Celtic Cup. The Ospreys topped the league table, making it two in a row for Welsh regional sides.

2005–06

In 2005, there were discussions over a potential Anglo-Welsh Cup competition which some saw as undermining the Celtic League. Despite Welsh assurances that the proposed Anglo-Welsh tournament would not interfere with their commitments to either the Celtic League in its present format or an expanded 'Rainbow League', the WRU made arrangements to play games on five weekends that clashed with Celtic League fixtures. The SRU and IRFU then threatened to expel the Welsh sides from the Celtic League in June 2005. It was proposed that the competition would continue as a Scottish and Irish affair for the 2005–06 season, with the possible addition of four Italian sides and the re-admittance of Welsh sides for the 2006–07 season. However a deal was reached that allowed for the Celtic League to continue with the Anglo-Welsh cup fixtures involving Welsh clubs rescheduled.

Despite these problems, the league enjoyed its most successful season, with the record attendance at a Celtic League match being broken four times, from 12,436 at the match between the Cardiff Blues and the Newport Gwent Dragons in December to 15,327 for the match between the Cardiff Blues and Leinster at the Millennium Stadium. The total attendances for the season were up nearly 50,000 at 571,331 compared to 521,449 for the previous season.

The league went down to the last round with Ulster and Leinster both in contention. Following Leinster's victory over Edinburgh and with Ulster losing against the Ospreys, it looked like the cup would go to Dublin but David Humphreys kicked a last-minute drop goal from 40 metres to clinch the game and the league for Ulster.

2006–07

In May 2006, Magners Irish Cider were named as the competition sponsors for the next five seasons, and the league was renamed as the Magners League. Although known as Bulmers Irish Cider in the Republic of Ireland, the Magners brand name was used there for the league. The sponsorship followed on from Magners' previous sponsorship deals with Edinburgh and the London Wasps.

The Scottish Rugby Union announced that the Borders territory would be disbanded from the end of the 2006–07 season. It may be revived when the Scottish Rugby Union debt decreases enough to make it financially viable along with a possible fourth Scottish territory (four professional teams being the original plan for the SRU) with Falkirk, Stirling or a London-based team being possible locations; or even the Caledonia Reds, the forgotten Scottish region. In the meantime Scotland would have only two professional teams based in Edinburgh and Glasgow.

The league's record attendance was smashed in this season with a full house at Lansdowne Road (48,000) for Leinster v Ulster. This was the last game in the stadium prior to its demolition, and was billed as "The Last Stand".

The league was won by the Ospreys on the final day of fixtures. The Blues' home win over Leinster allowed the Ospreys to top the league by a single point and take the title with an away win at Borders.

2007–08

Only ten teams competed in the 2007–08 season, after the Borders were disbanded at the end of the 2006–07 season. Glasgow Warriors moved their home games to Firhill. After missing out on the title on the last day for the previous two seasons, Leinster finally won the 2007–08 title with one game remaining. They had been runaway leaders for much of the season.

In April 2008 it was announced that the Celtic League was to introduce a play-off system commencing in the 2009–10 season to determine the winner, thus generating a greater climax to the season and bringing it in line with other major leagues such as the English Premiership and French Top 14.

2008–09

The 2008–09 season was decided quite early in the season as Munster claimed the title without playing, as they were preparing for their Heineken Cup semi-final against Leinster. The final challenge from Ospreys was snuffed out when the Dragons denied them a bonus point win on 30 April. Munster had led pretty much from the start of the season with a team largely captained by Mick O'Driscoll showing Munster's squad depth. Munster lost only four games, three to the other Irish teams, including a double loss to Ulster. Felipe Contepomi finished as league top scorer for Leinster, the year they went on to win the Heineken Cup.

2009–10

The 2009–10 season was the last 10-team league as the Italian teams joined in 2010–11. The league was one of the most competitive in years with perennial wooden-spooners Connacht challenging Ulster all the way for the third Irish Heineken Cup spot. Ulster needed a superb away bonus point win at Edinburgh to seal it, ending Edinburgh's own play-off hopes. Scarlets had a disappointing campaign as typical Welsh underdogs the Dragons had a great season, eventually finishing mid table and comfortably qualifying for the Heineken Cup. Luckily for the Scarlets, Cardiff Blues won the Amlin Cup and thereby earned Wales an extra Heineken Cup place. 2009–10 was also the first time a play-off was used to decide the champion, previously the top team at the end of the season was champion. The Scottish teams and particularly Glasgow came of age and had a fine season, finishing third in the end.

The four qualifiers for the play-offs were Leinster, Ospreys, Glasgow and Munster in that order, each country having at least one team. In the semi-finals Leinster defeated Munster at the RDS, after Ospreys overcame Glasgow in Swansea. In the 2010 Celtic League Grand Final at the RDS in Dublin the Ospreys shocked Leinster, winning the title 17–12 with their first win in Dublin in five years.

2010–11

The 2010–11 saw the introduction of the two Italian sides, Aironi and Benetton Treviso. In the new 12 team format, the play-offs came down to Munster hosting the Ospreys in one semi-final, and Leinster hosting Ulster in the other.

The two home sides went on to win their respective matches and the final was held in Thomond Park, home of Munster rugby, where they defeated Leinster (who had just been crowned champions of Europe a week earlier).

The Pro12 (2011–2017)

2011–12

The 2011–12 season saw a re-branding of the competition as the RaboDirect Pro12. Leinster were the runaway winners of the regular season, with a 10-point cushion over the Ospreys in second. The top four were Leinster, Ospreys, Munster and Warriors in that order.
Ospreys easily overcame Munster at home in the first semi-final in Swansea while Leinster beat the Glasgow Warriors in the RDS after giving up a strong lead. In the final, also held at the RDS, Leinster were aiming to become the first Celtic League team to complete a domestic and European double, after beating Ulster the previous week in the Heineken Cup final. After trailing for most of the game, Ospreys took a late lead through a try by Shane Williams. Dan Biggar then landed a difficult conversion to give Ospreys their fourth title by a single point, 31–30.

After two years in the competition Aironi played their final match, as their licence to compete was revoked by the FIR for financial reasons.

2012–13

With the demise of Aironi they were replaced with a new FIR controlled team to be based in Parma called Zebre, near the Aironi base in Viadana. The Welsh clubs chose to operate under a new self-imposed salary cap, which led to a number of departures from the Welsh teams as they strove to balance their books. Some high-profile Welsh players moved to the French Top 14, but other Pro12 teams also benefited with the likes of Casey Laulala going to Munster from Cardiff Blues, Sean Lamont to Glasgow from Scarlets, Dan Parks from Cardiff Blues to Connacht and Tommy Bowe from Ospreys back to Ulster.

Ulster topped the table in the regular season, with Leinster, Glasgow and Scarlets completing the top 4 in that order. They then went on to comfortably beat Scarlets 28–17 in Belfast, while Leinster were hard pressed by Glasgow in a tense 17–15 win for the hosts. In the final (held in the R.D.S. due to redevelopment of Ravenhill) Leinster prevailed 24–18 to win their 3rd title.

2013–14

Rabo Direct announced that this was to be their last season as sponsors. This, combined with the ongoing uncertainty surrounding the future of the European Cup, meant that there were concerns over the future commercial viability of the tournament. However, despite all off-field issues it was a successful season with a new high for both total attendance and for a single game (51,700 for Leinster v Munster).

In the end Leinster topped the table, having led for most of the season. Glasgow had a late surge to finish 2nd overtaking Munster and Ulster in the process. All four teams showed they were worthy contenders in the next round with Leinster needing to score a late try to beat Ulster 13–9 in Dublin while Glasgow just got past Munster in Scotstoun by one point to win 16–15. The final in the R.D.S. was also a close game for most of the match with Leinster forced to defend for long periods. However they eventually pulled clear, adding two late scores which made the final result look somewhat lopsided at 34–12.

2014–15

The RaboDirect title sponsor was replaced by Guinness. With the Heineken Cup being replaced by the 20-team European Rugby Champions Cup in the 2014–15 season, the Pro12 table had a greater impact on qualification. Under the previous format, the Pro12 provided a minimum of 10 teams, with Scotland and Italy providing two teams each, and Ireland and Wales both providing three. The new system saw a total of seven teams, with one place now being reserved for the highest-finishing Pro12 team from each of four participating countries and three other qualifiers based solely on league position. The other teams were entered in the new second-tier competition, the European Rugby Challenge Cup.

Leinster were the defending champions having beaten Glasgow Warriors in the previous season's playoff final, to become the first team in the league to successfully retain the trophy. Leinster were unable to defend their title as they failed to qualify for the end-of-season playoffs for the top four teams after the regular season. Glasgow Warriors finished the regular season on top of the table, and were crowned champions for the first time, beating second seeded team Munster 31–13 in the final. Thus, the Warriors became the first Scottish team to win a professional trophy, beating Edinburgh's appearance in the final of the 2014–15 European Rugby Challenge Cup.

2015–16

With the 2015 Rugby World Cup taking place during the opening months of the season, changes were made to the usual fixture schedule to minimise the effect on teams who released players to take part. The low number of games in the opening weeks of the season led to fixture congestion at the end of the tournament, with each team playing a game every weekend for 16 weeks straight from October 2015 to January 2016, including European matches.

As in the previous season, qualification to the European Champions Cup was guaranteed to the top team from each country participating in the league, with the three highest placed team's not already qualified also earning a berth. Unlike in the previous season where the 20th tournament spot was decided by a play-off involving teams from the Pro12, France's Top 14 and the English Premiership, due to fixture congestion from the World Cup, the final spot in the tournament was reserved for the winner of the 2015 European Challenge Cup if not already qualified.

The delayed start to the season, and absence of established international players during international Test and Six Nations windows, arguably gave some advantage to 'lesser' teams, and Connacht, coached by Pat Lam, duly led the league for much of the season. Despite not ultimately finishing top of the league, they converted their form into a maiden championship title in the post-league play-off matches, including a home semi-final victory over reigning champions Glasgow Warriors, and the Pro12 Final against league-topping Leinster at the neutral venue of Murrayfield Stadium in Edinburgh.

2016–17

Despite losing their first three matches, the Scarlets finished third in the league. They became the first team in the Pro 12's history to win an away semi-final, beating Leinster 27–15 at the RDS Arena, before beating league-topping Munster 46–22 at the Aviva Stadium. Scarlets wing Steff Evans ended up as the league's top try scorer with 11 tries.

The Pro14 Championship

2017–18

Big changes happened this season with the addition of two South African teams and a change from a league format of home and away to a conference structure championship. The 14 teams were split into two conferences of seven teams each. They play each team in their own conference twice (12 games) and each team in the other conference once (7 games), plus two derby games against the team(s) in the other conference from their own country, making 21 matches in total. The team that finishes top in each conference qualifies directly, one for each of the semi-finals, while the teams that finish second and third in each conference qualify as the four quarter-finalists to determine the other two semi-finalists.

Results

Since its inception, the competition has been dominated by Irish teams; in 21 years of the competition, Ireland has provided 13 of the champions, and 13 runners-up. The dominant team in this era has been Leinster, who have appeared in ten out of 12 finals playoff finals, and have won 8 league titles in total. The two closest rivals to this dominance have been domestic and European rivals Munster with three titles and six runners-up spots, and Welsh flagship Ospreys with two titles in the round-robin era and two in the play-offs era. Ulster, Connacht, Scarlets (twice, once as Llanelli Scarlets, once as Scarlets), Glasgow Warriors and Stormers have also taken home the title. The 2021–22 tournament marked the first title won by a South African team: the Stormers. This year's competition also featured the first grand final not to contain a single Irish team as the losing finalists, the Bulls, are also South African.

No Italian side has yet reached an ordinary league final. The best play-off performance from the nation was a single quarter-final appearance: in 2019 for Benetton Rugby for Italy. Benetton did however emerge as champions of the Covid-affected transitional championship, the Pro14 Rainbow Cup, which was designed to introduce the former Super Rugby sides to European rugby competition. Although not treated as a championship in the ordinary lineal line, the 2021 Rainbow Cup is considered an official URC competition, along with the defunct Celtic Cup knockout tournament. As such, every country in the competition has at least once taken home league-wide silverware. 

As of 2022, four Regional Shields will also be awarded annually. The inaugural winners of the Irish, Welsh, South African and Scottish-Italian URC Shields were Leinster, Ospreys, Stormers and Edinburgh respectively.

By year

League

Below are the list of champions, runners-up and table toppers each season.

Celtic Cup

The Celtic Cup was a short-lived single elimination knock-out competition, held alongside the Celtic League.

Rainbow Cup

The Pro14 Rainbow Cup was a one-off 'transitional' or 'Spring Season' tournament created to facilitate the integration of the four South African sides into the United Rugby Championship. ahead of the 2021–22 season. For the first time, an Italian team and a South African team reached the final of an official Celtic League/Pro Rugby competition, with Benetton Treviso winning Italy's first-ever trophy at Pro Rugby level.

Regional Shields

From the 2021–2022 season, a trophy will be awarded to each team that finishes top of its regional 'pool' (with Scottish and Italian teams sharing a trophy). The Irish Shield, Welsh Shield, South African Shield and Scottish-Italian Shield champions will also received guaranteed entry to the following season's European Rugby Champions Cup, regardless of position in the overall table.

By championship wins

By country

'Perfect Seasons' and League-Europe 'doubles' 
Only one team has achieved the feat of winning every match during a season of the competition, Leinster Rugby, who have achieved the 'perfect season' twice; 2001-02 and 2019-20.

Leinster are also the only team from the competition to achieve a domestic and European double, winning a 'minor double' with  the 2012–13 Pro12 title and the 2012–13 European Challenge Cup, before claiming the 'full double' of the 2017–18 Pro14 and the 2017–18 European Rugby Champions Cup.  

The Champions Cup has been won by URC clubs on seven occasions, Leinster 4 times, Munster twice and Ulster once. The Challenge Cup has come back to the league three times, once with Leinster and twice with Cardiff Rugby.

Player of the year

Player statistics

Career
Bold indicates active player in United Rugby Championship

Updated as of 21 August 2022  Statistics do not include those from Celtic Cup or Rainbow Cup matches.

 Most successful kicks: 397 – Dan Parks, Glasgow, Cardiff Blues and Connacht

Season

Updated as 2 June 2021
 Most successful kicks: 99 – Neil Jenkins, Celtic Warriors, 2003–04
 Most appearances: 24 – Rob Harley, Glasgow, 2013–14; Finlay Bealham, Connacht, 2015–16; Hadleigh Parkes, Scarlets, 2016–17

Attendance

List of final venues
From 2002 to 2003 and from 2010 to 2014, the higher ranked team in the final were the hosting team. Between 2003 and 2010, no play-off was held and final standings determined the champion. However, from the 2014–15 Pro12 season onward, a pre-determined stadium was chosen at the start of the season that would host the final. In 2021–22, the inaugural United Rugby Championship season, the competition reverted to the highest seeded team hosting the final.

With 5 finals, RDS Arena, the home stadium of Leinster Rugby, has hosted the final most often. Of the five participating nations, only Italy have not yet hosted a linear final, although Benetton Rugby did host the transitional Pro14 Rainbow Cup final in their stadium, Stadio Comunale di Monigo.

Notes

See also

1872 Cup – Scottish derby
Celtic Cup (2003), a short-lived knockout tournament for Celtic League teams
Celtic Cup (2018), a tournament of the same name for Pro14 development teams from Ireland and Wales
Anglo-Welsh Cup
British and Irish Cup
European Challenge Cup
European Professional Club Rugby
European Rugby Challenge Cup
European Rugby Champions Cup
Heineken Cup
Judgement Day – Welsh derbies
Sports league attendances
Welsh Premier Division
Major League Rugby
Súper Liga Americana de Rugby
List of professional sports teams in the United Kingdom

References

External links
 Official website

 
 
International organisations based in Ireland
Inter-Celtic organisations
Rugby union competitions in Europe for clubs and provinces
 
 
 
 
Professional sports leagues in the United Kingdom
Rugby union
Rugby union
Rugby union
Multi-national sports leagues in Europe
Multi-national professional rugby union leagues
Multi-national professional sports leagues